Rukshar Dhillon (born 12 October 1993) is an actress based in India who primarily works in Telugu films. Dhillon was born in London and brought up in India. She made her debut in 2016 with the Kannada Run Antony. She went on to star in Telugu films such as Aakatayi, Krishnarjuna Yudham, and ABCD: American Born Confused Desi.  In 2020 she appeared in the Hindi film Bhangra Paa Le.

Life
Rukshar Dhillon was born in London and is of Punjabi descent. She was brought up in Goa and her family is now settled in Bangalore. She graduated in fashion designing.

Dhillon began her film career with Run Antony opposite Vinay Rajkumar, grandson of actor Dr. Rajkumar. The film was a romantic-thriller written and directed by director Raghu Shastry.The Times of India reviewed the movie and gave her special mentions. The newspaper stated, "Rukshar excels in her role".

In April 2018, she appeared in the Telugu film  Krishnarjuna Yudham opposite Nani. The Times of India stated,"Rukshar Dhillon too looks adorable in her role".

She made her Hindi debut with Bhangra Paa Le in 2020. The Times of India stated "Rukshar Dhillon as the big city girl is confidence personified". Filmfare further on mentioned "Rukshar does a good job for her first film. She too has killer moves and has a strong screen presence".

Filmography

References

External links
 

1993 births
Living people
Indian film actresses
21st-century Indian actresses
Actresses in Telugu cinema
Punjabi people
Actresses in Kannada cinema
Actresses from London
21st-century English women
21st-century English people
Actresses from Goa